The World Islamic Economic Forum (WIEF) or World Islamic Economic Forum Foundation is a business forum headquartered in Malaysia. Its purpose is to promote business, link the Muslim and non-Muslim worlds, and to guide the world towards peace and prosperity. The first World Islamic Economic Forum was held in Kuala Lumpur, Malaysia and the 14th and next WIEF will held in October 2020, in Qatar.

References

External links

 World Islamic Economic Forum Foundation

Global economic conferences
Islamic economics